Bream (historically known as Breem) is a village in the Forest of Dean, west Gloucestershire, England. The population was around 3,170 in the 2011 census.

Governance
An electoral ward in the same name exists. Its area and total population are the same as quoted above.

History
Human activity at Bream dates back to the Iron Age, when iron ore was being mined in the local area.

The first dwellings in Bream were recorded in 1452. In 1505, the St. James' church, Bream or St. James chapel as it was then known, was built.  In 1712, the population of Bream was 300.

In 1822, the church was reconstructed.

The main employment in the village in the past was coal mining, farming, and forestry. Today with the mines closed, there is very little employment now in the village, although there are two garages and several shops.  Bream is one of the largest villages in the Forest of Dean District with a population of just under 3,200 as of January 2011. It is just one of a number of settlements which make up the Forest Ring of settlements on the fringes of the statutory Royal Forest.  Positioned on the southern edge of the forest core between the towns of Lydney and Coleford, the village is set on a ridge of high ground, falling away on three sides.

Sport 
Bream has a rugby union team with rugby pitches and members bar, and a cricket club with pitches and members bar.

Notable residents 
Wayne Barnes (born 1979) - International rugby union referee. Lived in Bream and played for Bream Rugby Club.
Warren James (1792–1841) - Miners' leader who led the Foresters to action against the Crown, in 1831. Lived in Bream.
Ron Moore - rugby union (RU) and rugby league (RL) footballer of the 1930s for Bream RFC (RU), Wakefield Trinity, and Bramley lived in Bream.
William "Billy" Stone - rugby union (RU) and rugby league (RL) footballer of the 1910s, and 1920s for Bream RFC (RU), Great Britain (RL), England, and Hull F.C. lived in Bream.

References

External links

Information
Old photos and information about Bream
Photos of Bream and area

Forest of Dean
Villages in Gloucestershire